Kvam Station is a railway station located at the town of Kvam in Nord-Fron, Norway. The station is located on the Dovre Line and served regional trains with one departure southwards to Lillehammer and one to Oslo each day. Too the north there is one departure to Åndalsnes and one to Dombås each day. The station was opened in 1896 when the Dovre Line was extended from Tretten Station to Otta Station.

Railway stations in Oppland
Railway stations on the Dovre Line
Railway stations opened in 1896
1896 establishments in Norway